The NLEX Road Warriors is a professional basketball team owned by NLEX Corporation, a subsidiary of Metro Pacific Investments Corporation, currently playing in the Philippine Basketball Association (PBA) since the 2014–2015 season.

The Road Warriors began in the PBA Developmental League (PBA D-League) as one its founding teams, winning a total of six championships. The franchise transferred to the PBA after the Manila North Tollways Corporation (a subsidiary of Metro Pacific Investments Corporation) acquired the PBA franchise of the Air21 Express in June 2014. It is one of three PBA teams currently under the control of businessman Manuel V. Pangilinan (the other teams are the TNT Tropang Giga and the Meralco Bolts).

History

PBA D-League

From 2011 to 2014, the Road Warriors were the dominant team in the PBA D-League, setting a record six championships in the seven conferences that it participated. It is the second PBA D-League franchise to join the PBA.

PBA expansion franchise application
In March 2014, Manila North Tollways Corporation (MNTC) submitted its letter of intent to join the PBA as an expansion team. On April 10, 2014, the PBA Board of Governors unanimously approved the application of NLEX, Ever Bilena Cosmetics, Inc. (Blackwater Elite) and Columbian Autocar Corporation (Kia Sorento) as expansion teams for the 2014–2015 season.

As a concession to Kia, which did not have a basketball team in the PBA D-League, the PBA board of governors did not allow Blackwater and NLEX to elevate their D-League players. Instead, the three expansion teams will build their teams through an expansion draft (with the ten existing teams protecting fourteen players in their respective rosters), the free agency and the rookie draft, in which the expansion teams will be given the 11th, 12th and 13th pick in the first round of the 2014 PBA draft.

Additional concessions were given to the three expansion teams at the conclusion of the special meeting by PBA board of governors, three weeks after approving their franchise application. These included the revision of the expansion draft in which the ten existing teams will protect twelve players (from the previous fourteen), and the first three picks of the second round of the 2014 PBA draft. Only the three expansion teams will be allowed to pick players after the third round of the rookie draft.

Acquisition of the Air21 Express PBA franchise

While Kia and Blackwater have paid their respective franchise fees, NLEX requested for an extension, as they were studying whether to enter the PBA as an expansion team or acquire an existing PBA franchise.

On June 17, 2014, MNTC announced that it was having negotiations with a PBA team to acquire their franchise. Due to the ongoing Governors' Cup playoffs, MNTC did not identify the team they were negotiating with, but stated it will reveal the team's identity once the team was eliminated. Days later, the team was revealed to be Air21 Express.

On June 23, 2014, an agreement was reached between MNTC and the Lina Group of Companies (owners of Air21 Express) regarding the sale of its PBA franchise to MNTC. The sale was approved during the regular monthly meeting of the board of governors, paving the way for the sale of the franchise to MNTC.

PBA 2015 Commissioner's Cup
On January 2, 2015, NBA 2007 14th overall pick Al Thornton signed with the Road Warriors.

Yeng Guiao's transfer to NLEX
The NLEX Road Warriors took a big step with multi-titled coach Yeng Guiao, who joined the team as head coach before the 2016–17 season following a successful stint handling Rain or Shine. Guiao also became NLEX's general manager. 

In July 2018, they represented the Philippines, along with Blackwater Elite in the Asia League's Summer Super 8 Invitational Tournament held in Macau.

Under Coach Guiao, NLEX became a playoff contender and made two semifinal appearances, with its most recent being in the 2021 Governors’ Cup where they lost to eventual champion Barangay Ginebra. NLEX however, failed to make the Finals during his time there. NLEX also had to deal with losing some of its stars, as Poy Erram (along with a first-round pick that turned into Mikey Williams) was traded to TNT, Kiefer Ravena left for the B.League in Japan, and Jericho Cruz signed with the San Miguel Beermen in free agency. 

On September 2, 2022, Guiao left the Road Warriors after failing to come to terms with a contract extension.

Current roster

Head coaches

Season-by-season records

Records from the 2022–23 PBA season:

*one-game playoffs**team had the twice-to-beat advantage

See also
NLEX Road Warriors draft history

References

 
2014 establishments in the Philippines
Basketball teams established in 2014